Paul Emile François Henri Vanden Boeynants (22 May 1919 – 9 January 2001) was a Belgian politician. He served as the prime minister of Belgium for two brief periods (1966–68 and 1978–79).

Career
Vanden Boeynants (called "VDB" by journalists) was born in Forest / Vorst, a municipality now in the Brussels-Capital Region. Active as a businessman in the meat industry, he was a Representative for the PSC-CVP between 1949 and 1979. From 1961 to 1966 he led the Christian democrat PSC-CVP (which was in those days a single party). He led the CEPIC, its conservative fraction.

Vanden Boeynants served as minister for the middle class (1958-1961). In 1966, he became Prime Minister of Belgium; he stayed in this post for two years. From 1972-1979 he served as minister of defense. In 1978–1979 he led another Belgian government. Vanden Boeynants then served as chairman of the PSC (1979-1981). He left politics in 1995, and died of pneumonia after undergoing cardiovascular surgery in 2001.

One of his famous expressions, in a unique mixture of Dutch and French, was:
Trop is te veel en te veel is trop. ("too many is too much and too much is too many").

Fraud
Convicted in 1986 for fraud and tax evasion, Vanden Boeynants was given a suspended jail sentence of three years. This prevented him from pursuing mayoral aspirations in Brussels. He underwent a political rehabilitation during the early 1990s.

Kidnapping
In an incident that is still the subject of dispute, Vanden Boeynants was kidnapped on 14 January 1989 by members of the Haemers criminal gang. Three days later, the criminals published a note in the leading Brussels newspaper Le Soir, demanding 30 million Belgian francs in ransom. Vanden Boeynants was released unharmed a month later, on 13 February, when an undisclosed ransom was paid to the perpetrators. The gang members were caught and imprisoned. Patrick Haemers, the head of the gang, died from suicide in prison, and two members of his gang managed to escape from the St Gillis Prison in 1993.

In popular culture
The kidnapping was referenced in a 1989 novelty song by the New Beat band Brussels Sound Revolution called "Qui...?", which featured samples from the press conference Vanden Boeynants gave after his kidnapping. It was a hit on both sides of the Belgian language border. In Flanders, Belgium, it reached the 28th place in the Radio 2 hitparade at the time for one week.

Honours 
 : Minister of State, by Royal Decree.
  Grand Cordon in the Order of Leopold.
  Knight Grand Cross in the Order of Leopold II.
  Knight Grand Cross in the Order of Saints Michael and George.
  Grand Officer in the Legion of Honour.

Literature
 N. Hirson, Paul Vanden Boeynants, Brussels, 1969.
 Paul Debogne, Les Amis de Paul Vanden Boeynants et leurs Affaires, Ed. Vie Ouvrière, Brussel, 1970.
 R. Stuyck, Paul Vanden Boeynants, boeman of supermen?, Brussels, 1973.
 Els Cleemput & Alain Guillaume, La rançon d'une vie. Paul Vanden Boeynants 30 jours aux mains de Patrick Haemers, Brussels, 1990.
 D. Ilegems & J. Willems, De avonturen van VDB, Brussels, 1991.
 P. Havaux & P. Marlet, Sur la piste du crocodile, Brussels, 1994.
 Armand De Decker, In memoriam Paul Vanden Boeynants, Belgian Senate, 18 January 2001.

References

External links
 Paul Vanden Boeynants in ODIS - Online Database for Intermediary Structures

|-

|-

1919 births
2001 deaths
20th-century Belgian criminals
20th-century Belgian politicians
20th-century Belgian businesspeople
Belgian fraudsters
Belgian Ministers of State
Belgian Roman Catholics
Christian Social Party (Belgium, defunct) politicians
Recipients of the Grand Cross of the Order of Leopold II
Kidnapped Belgian people
Kidnapped politicians
Missing person cases in Belgium
People from Forest, Belgium
Prime Ministers of Belgium
Political controversies in Belgium